Edwin Fremont Ladd (December 13, 1859June 22, 1925) was a United States senator from North Dakota. While in the Senate, he was chairman of the Committee on Public Roads and Surveys during the sixty-eighth Congress.

Biography
He was born in Starks, Maine on December 13, 1859. He attended the public schools and Somerset Academy (Athens, Maine) and graduated from the University of Maine at Orono in 1884. He was a chemist of the New York State Experiment Station in Geneva, New York from 1884 to 1890 and dean of the school of chemistry and pharmacy and professor of chemistry at the North Dakota Agricultural College, Fargo, North Dakota. He was chief chemist of the North Dakota Agricultural Experiment Station from 1890 to 1916 and editor of the North Dakota Farmer at Lisbon from 1899 to 1904. He was administrator of the State's pure-food laws, for which he actively crusaded from 1902 to 1921; he was also president of the North Dakota Agricultural College from 1916 to 1921.

Ladd was elected as a Republican to the U.S. Senate in 1920 and served from March 4, 1921. He died at Johns Hopkins Hospital in Baltimore, Maryland on June 22, 1925. Interment was in Glenwood Cemetery, Washington, D.C.

See also
List of United States Congress members who died in office (1900–49)

References

Bibliography

External links
 

1859 births
1925 deaths
People from Somerset County, Maine
American people of English descent
Republican Party United States senators from North Dakota
North Dakota Republicans
American chemists
University of Maine alumni
Presidents of North Dakota State University
Burials at Glenwood Cemetery (Washington, D.C.)